Wilbraham Wesleyan Academy was one of the oldest educational institutions of the Methodist Episcopal Church. It was established by Methodist clergy of New England in 1818. Originally located in New Market, New Hampshire, before moving to Wilbraham, Massachusetts, it was intended both for general educational purposes and for young men intending to enter the ordained ministry.

Move to Massachusetts
In 1824 an act of incorporation was obtained from the legislature of Massachusetts, and the academy was moved to Wilbraham, where it opened in September 1825. 

Eight students were present on opening day, and thirty-five attended during that first term. It had a history of coeducation and had classes of 200-300 students. Its first principal after it moved to Massachusetts was Dr. Wilbur Fisk, who served until 1831. That year he became president of Wesleyan University in Connecticut. 

In 1971 the academy merged with Monson Academy, established in 1804. It became known as Wilbraham & Monson Academy. It continues to operate as a college preparatory school for grades 9-12 on the Wilbraham campus.

Other principals
 W. McK. Bangs, A.M. (1831–32)
 John Foster, A.M.(1832–34)
 David Patton, D.D. (1834–41)
 Charles Adams, D.D. (1841–45)
 Robert Allyn, D.D. (1845–48)
 Minor Raymond, D.D. (1848–64)
 Edward Cooke, D.D. (1864–74)
 Nathaniel Fellows, A.M. (1874-?)

Academic facilities
There were six buildings devoted to academic purposes, the chief of which were "large and most conveniently arranged". Its library at the time contained 5,300 volumes, with "good philosophical, chemical and mathematical apparatus, a cabinet, museum, and apparatus valued at $14,000" (at that time).

Faculty and student body
The academy employed "a corps of able professors" in the various departments. Its students, which included both young men and young women (indeed, one-third of the total students were women, somewhat unusual at that time), averaged between 200 and 300 per year.  Many engaged in teaching and professional studies. Some prepared for college.

Notable alumni
 Margaret Jewett Smith Bailey (1812?-1882), member of the Oregon Mission
 Osman Cleander Baker (1812–1871), a bishop of the Methodist Episcopal Church
 Lettie S. Bigelow (1849-1906), poet and author
 Isaac Goodnow (1814–1894), a founder of Kansas State University and Manhattan, Kansas
 John Christian Keener  (1819–1906), a bishop of the Methodist Episcopal Church, South
 Jason Lee (1803-1845), member of the Oregon Mission
 David Leslie (c. 1797-1869), member of the Oregon Mission
 Elizabeth Eunice Marcy (1821–1911), author, activist, and social reformer
 Oronhyatekha (Peter Martin) (1841-1907), (Mohawk), second accredited Native medical doctor in Canada, first aboriginal student at Oxford University, businessman and statesman 
 William Rice (1821–1897), Methodist minister and librarian
 Richard S. Rust (1815–1906), Methodist preacher, abolitionist, educator, and founder of multiple colleges and institutions
 Susan J. Swift Steele (1822–1895), social reformer
 Robert H. W. Strang (1881-1982), first orthodontist in the state of Connecticut
 John W. Wescott (1849–1927), Attorney General of New Jersey
 Chloe Clark Willson (1818-1874), member of the Oregon Mission

Notes

References

 

Defunct Christian schools in the United States
Defunct schools in Massachusetts
Defunct schools in New Hampshire
History of Methodism in the United States
Methodist schools in the United States
Schools in Hampden County, Massachusetts
United Methodist seminaries
1824 establishments in Massachusetts
Christian schools in Massachusetts